In this list there are the footballers who played for the Bosnia and Herzegovina senior national football team who are born outside Bosnia and Herzegovina, who played at list one match with the national team. Naturalized Bosnian players are included too.

List of Players 
-Players in bold are currently playing for Bosnia and Herzegovina

-Last update on 23 September 2022

Austria

Belgium

Brazil

Croatia

Denmark

France

Germany

North Macedonia

Portugal

Serbia

Slovenia

Spain

Sweden

Switzerland

List by country of birth

References 

Bosnia and Herzegovina
 
Bosnia and Herzegovina diaspora
Association football player non-biographical articles
Bosnia